Igor Silva de Almeida (born 21 August 1996), simply known as Igor Silva or formerly Igor Carioca, is a Brazilian professional footballer who plays as a right-back for French club Lorient.

Career
Born in Rio de Janeiro, Igor started his professional career with Comercial Futebol Clube in Brazil. In 2013, at the age of 13, he made his first team debut in the Copa Paulista. Two years later, he featured for the team in Paulista A2. In 2015, he moved abroad and joined the academy of Greek club Asteras Tripoli. He was promoted to the senior team in the following season. He spent two seasons with the club, amassing 34 caps, scoring one goal and adding two assists. On 11 January 2018, he joined fellow league club Olympiacos as a replacement for the departing Diogo Figueiras.

However, Igor did not play regularly after being found surplus to requirements by manager Pedro Martins. On 18 July 2019, he joined Cypriot club AEK Larnaca on a season-long loan deal.
On 18 July 2018 after a year in Cyprus, he joined Croatian club NK Osijek on a season-long loan deal. On 29 July 2020, Osijek announce the acquisition of the player signing a three-year contract from Olympiacos on a transfer fee in the range of €1 million.

On 23 July 2021, he joined French club Lorient on a five-year contract.

Style of play
Although Igor Silva started his career as a forward, he switched his position to right back during his stint in the Asteras Tripolis academy.

Career statistics

Honours
AEK Larnaca
 Cypriot Super Cup: 2018
Individual
Cypriot First Division Team of the Year: 2018–19
Croatian First League Team of the Year: 2019–20, 2020–21

References

External links
Superleague Greece profile

1996 births
Living people
Brazilian footballers
Association football defenders
Asteras Tripolis F.C. players
Olympiacos F.C. players
AEK Larnaca FC players
NK Osijek players
FC Lorient players
Super League Greece players
Cypriot First Division players
Croatian Football League players
Ligue 1 players
Brazilian expatriate footballers
Brazilian expatriate sportspeople in Greece
Expatriate footballers in Greece
Brazilian expatriate sportspeople in Cyprus
Expatriate footballers in Cyprus
Brazilian expatriate sportspeople in Croatia
Expatriate footballers in Croatia
Brazilian expatriate sportspeople in France
Expatriate footballers in France
Footballers from Rio de Janeiro (city)